ALP-IX Regional Internet Exchange  (ALP-IX) is an Internet Exchange Point situated in Munich (Germany). It is operated by DE-CIX Management GmbH. In 2011 the ALP-IX was renamed to DE-CIX Munich to be in line with their main brand.

ALP-IX operates on a Force10 TeraScale C300 switch and serves the Equinix "Hopfenpost" location as well as the Spacenet Datacenter at Landsberger Straße in Munich.

See also 
 List of Internet exchange points

External links
 Website of ALP-IX

Internet exchange points in Germany